Henner Henkel defeated Bunny Austin 6–1, 6–4, 6–3 in the final to win the men's singles tennis title at the 1937 French Championships.

Seeds
The seeded players are listed below. Henner Henkel is the champion; others show the round in which they were eliminated.

  Bunny Austin (finalist)
  Bernard Destremau (semifinals)
  Henner Henkel (champion)
  Georg Von Metaxa (third round)
  Giorgio de Stefani (third round)
  Paul Feret (fourth round)
  Josef Caska (third round)
  Charles R. Harris (third round)
  André Merlin (fourth round)
  Kho Sin-Kie (third round)
  Patrick Hughes (quarterfinals)
  Frantisek Cejnar (quarterfinals)
  Vernon Kirby (third round)
  Marcel Bernard (third round)
  Adam Baworowski (fourth round)
  Jozef Hebda (third round)

Draw

Key
 Q = Qualifier
 WC = Wild card
 LL = Lucky loser
 r = Retired

Finals

Earlier rounds

Section 1

Section 2

Section 3

Section 4

Section 5

Section 6

Section 7

Section 8

References

External links
   on the French Open website

1937 in French tennis
1937